"Bulería" is the David Bisbal's fourth official single and the lead single off his second studio album Bulería. The single was released in Spain early 2004. The singer performed the song with Camila Cabello on Cabello's Never Be the Same Tour Live in Madrid.

Formats and track listings
CD single
"Bulería"
CD single – France
"Bulería" (Radio Edit)
"Bulería" (Remix - Radio Edit)
CD single – Canada
"Bulería" (Original Version)
"Bulería" (Remix)
"Bulería" (Without Flamenco Guitar Intro. Version)
"Bulería" (Without Bulería Vocals Version)
Digital download – live version
"Bulería (Live)" – 4:10

Credits and personnel
Publishing
 Phonographic Copyright (p) – Vale Music Spain S.L.
 Copyright (c) – Vale Music Spain S.L.
 Record company – Vale Music Spain S.L.
 Produced for – Santander Productions
 Mastered at – Metropolis Mastering
 Published by – Kike Santander Music, LLC
 Published by – Santander Melodies, LLC
 Published by – Famous Music Corporation

Personnel
 David Bisbal – vocals
 Gustavo Santander – songwriting
 Kike Santander – songwriting, production, arrangement, strings arrangement, wind Arrangement
 Daniel Betancourt – production, arrangement, strings arrangement, keyboards programming
 Milton Salcedo – strings arrangement
 Camilo Valencia – wind Arrangement
 Jose Gaviria – backing vocals, 
 Rafa Vergara – backing vocals, coros flamencos backing vocals
 Robin Espejo – backing vocals 
 Vicky Echeverry – backing vocals 
 Paco Fonta – coros flamencos backing vocals, handclaps
 Virginia Moreno – coros flamencos backing vocals, handclaps
 Konstantin Litvinenko – Cello
 Francesc Freixes – graphic design
 Kike Santander – direction
 Rayito – flamenco guitar, handclaps
 Academia de Artistas – management
 Tony Cousins – mastering
 Richard Bravo – percussion
 Rubendarío – photography
 Victor Moscardó – photography
 Milton Salcedo – piano
 Ed Calle – tenor saxophone, baritone saxophone
 Dana Teboe – trombone
 Jason Carder – trumpet
 Luis Aquino – trumpet
 Pedro Alfonso – violin, viola

Charts

Certifications

See also
 List of number-one singles of 2004 (Spain)

References

Number-one singles in Spain
Spanish-language songs
David Bisbal songs
2004 singles
2003 songs
Songs written by Kike Santander
Songs written by Gustavo Santander